The 2014 FIM MotoGP World Championship was the premier class of the 66th F.I.M. Road Racing World Championship season. Marc Márquez started the season as the defending riders' champion in the MotoGP category, with Honda the defending manufacturers' champions.

Season summary 
Winning a premier class record 13 races during the season, Márquez won a second successive title, finishing 67 points clear of his nearest rival Valentino Rossi. Márquez won each of the first 10 races to be held in 2014, before Repsol Honda teammate Dani Pedrosa was able to inflict his first defeat, at Brno. Rossi had taken eight podiums in the season, before he was able to win a race, when he won at Misano. He also won at Phillip Island, as he finished as the championship runner-up in a Grand Prix class for the first time since , when he finished second to Nicky Hayden. Despite bookending his season with retirements, Rossi's Movistar Yamaha MotoGP teammate Jorge Lorenzo finished third in the championship. Finishing 32 points behind Rossi, Lorenzo took back-to-back victories in Aragon, and Japan, as part of a nine-race podium streak that was ended by his retirement in Valencia. The only other race winner was Pedrosa, with his Brno triumph being his sole victory in the 2014 campaign.

The Espargaró brothers were each able to take one of the sub-classifications available to them. Pol Espargaró finished as the best place rookie in the final championship standings, finishing sixth overall; the next best rookie was Scott Redding in twelfth place. Aleix Espargaró was the best placed rider that was competing with an Open-specification motorcycle. He finished seventh overall in the championship, taking a pole position at Assen and a second-place finish in Aragon. Just like the rookie of the year standings, Redding was the next best rider. Márquez was a comfortable winner of the BMW M Award for the best qualifying rider, with 13 pole positions during the season. Repsol Honda were the winners of the teams' championship, as the results for Márquez and Pedrosa allowed them to finish 50 points clear of Movistar Yamaha MotoGP, while Honda won the constructors' championship for the 21st time – and their 63rd title in total – 55 points clear of Yamaha.

Calendar
The Fédération Internationale de Motocyclisme released a 19-race provisional calendar on 2 October 2013. The calendar was updated on 13 December 2013 and again on 24 February 2014, resulting in a calendar of 18 races.

The following Grands Prix took place in 2014:

 ‡ = Night race
 †† = Saturday race

Calendar changes
 The Argentine Grand Prix was added to the calendar, the series' first visit to South America since 2004. The venue hosting the round was the new Autódromo Termas de Río Hondo, instead of the Autódromo Juan y Oscar Gálvez which hosted the round until 1999.
 The United States Grand Prix, present since 2005, was taken off the calendar because the race could not initially be run with all 3 classes in the United States due to Californian environmental laws, and that in turn caused the race at the Laguna Seca Raceway to become unsustainable.
A race in Brazil at the Autódromo Internacional Nelson Piquet in Brasilia was scheduled for 28 September, but was subsequently removed from the calendar. The round at MotorLand Aragón was moved back by a week, following the cancellation of the Brazilian round.

Teams and riders
Starting in 2014, the rules governing the eligibility of entries changed. MSMA prototypes were reclassified as the new "Factory" class, whilst the Claiming Rule Teams sub-category was restructured as the "Open" class. All bikes used the approved MotoGP Electronic Control Unit, with bikes in the "Open" class using both the MotoGP ECU and identical software, and those competing as "Factory" entries permitted to use their own custom software. The Factory option bike had their allocation of engines reduced from twelve to five, and those five had their design frozen. The amount of fuel allowed was reduced from twenty-four litres to twenty litres.

A subsequent modification, only officialized in March, stated that a manufacturer who had not achieved a win in dry conditions in the previous year, or a new manufacturer entering the championship, could enter under the Factory option with all the concessions available to the Open class; these benefits were reduced in case of a determined number of podiums or wins.

Ducati Team and Pramac Racing were due to enter their bikes in the Open class but revised regulations meant that they were finally entered under the Factory option with Open concessions.

A provisional entry list was released by the Fédération Internationale de Motocyclisme on 20 November 2013. An updated entry list was released on 14 January 2014. Teams had time until 28 February to decide if a rider would be assigned to the "Factory" or "Open" class. The final entry list was released on the same day.

All the bikes used Bridgestone tyres.

Team changes
 Aspar Team and Cardion AB Motoracing switched to Honda in 2014, entering the RCV1000R, Honda's Open class machine.
 Forward Racing intended to use Yamaha-leased YZR-M1 engines with FTR frames, however the team started the season with a complete Yamaha YZR-M1 engine-frame-swingarm package with other parts supplied by FTR, while developing new Forward-designed frames to be introduced mid-season. At the Mugello round Colin Edwards debuted the new frame built by Harris Performance. Following Edwards' retirement from racing, the new frame was passed to de Angelis, while Espargaró remained with the Yamaha-derived chassis.
 Gresini Racing competed with a full Honda package in the Open class, having contested the 2013 season with an FTR chassis and Honda engine.
 IodaRacing Project intended to enter a second bike ridden by Leon Camier, but he was not included on the final entry list due to an apparent lack of funding.

Rider changes
 Nicky Hayden moved from Ducati Corse to Aspar Team. Cal Crutchlow left Yamaha Tech 3 to take Hayden's place.
 2013 Moto2 Riders' Champion Pol Espargaró joined the premier category, racing for Yamaha Tech 3.
 Aleix Espargaró moved from Aspar Racing to Forward Racing.
 Hiroshi Aoyama moved to Aspar Racing after competing for Avintia Blusens in 2013.
 Bryan Staring left Gresini Racing, with his place taken by 2013 Moto2 runner-up Scott Redding.
 Yonny Hernández remained with Pramac Racing after Ben Spies retired from racing at the end of the 2013 season.
 Mike Di Meglio joined the premier category, racing for Avintia Racing.
 Broc Parkes made his MotoGP debut with Paul Bird Motorsport.
 Leon Camier contested the Indianapolis, Czech Republic, British, and San Marino races for Aspar Team as an injury replacement for Nicky Hayden.
 Alex de Angelis replaced Colin Edwards from Brno onwards.

Results and standings

Grands Prix

Riders' standings
Scoring system
Points were awarded to the top fifteen finishers. A rider had to finish the race to earn points.

Constructors' standings

Scoring system
Points were awarded to the top fifteen finishers. A rider had to finish the race to earn points.

 Each constructor got the same number of points as their best placed rider in each race.

Teams' standings
The teams' standings were based on results obtained by regular and substitute riders; wild-card entries were ineligible.

References

External links
 

 
MotoGP
Grand Prix motorcycle racing seasons